Kenneth Mason may refer to:

 Kenneth Mason (cricketer) (1881–1974), Barbadian cricketer
 Kenneth Mason (geographer) (1887–1976), soldier and geographer 
 Ken Mason (bishop) (1928–2018), Anglican bishop
 Ken Mason (footballer), former soccer player who represented New Zealand